Tumusiime Rushedge (1 March 1941 – 2008) was a Ugandan surgeon, pilot, novelist, cartoonist and newspaper columnist. He was known as "Tom Rush". He wrote a weekly column in the Sunday Vision, called "Old Fox".  He was the brain behind the cartoon strip "Ekanya", which was published daily in the New Vision. The cartoons centred on the drunken character Ekanya and his struggling wife Rosie, and has remained popular since the early 1970s.
He is the author of a novel, The Corrupt, the Quick and the Dead.

Early life and education
Tumusiime was born on 1 March 1941 in Buhweju county, Bushenyi District. He was the first-born of seven children, born to the Rev. Andereya Rushedge and Eseza Bantu. He grew up in a Christian home and during his childhood, he was greatly involved in Emmanuel Church Kabwohe as a drummer calling worshippers to Sunday service.

He attended Kibubura Boys Primary School in Ibanda, for his primary education. For secondary education, he went on to Mbarara High School (1954–1957) and Ntare School (1958–1960). He designed the school badge of Ntare school while a student there. He studied Medicine at Makerere University in 1961. There, again he excelled and in 1966 he graduated with honours, going on to specialise in ear, nose and throat (ENT). He attained a postgraduate diploma at Medical School. He went for further studies in the US and attained a master's degree in Surgery in Chicago. For his accomplishment in the medical fields of ENT and neurology, he was awarded a professorship.

Published works

References 

1941 births
2008 deaths
20th-century male writers
20th-century novelists
Kumusha
Makerere University alumni
Male novelists
People educated at Mbarara High School
People educated at Ntare School
Ugandan cartoonists
Ugandan columnists
Ugandan male writers
Ugandan novelists
Ugandan writers